The American Lebanese Syrian Associated Charities (ALSAC) is the fundraising and advocacy organization for St. Jude Children's Research Hospital. Its sole mission is to raise the funds and awareness necessary for St. Jude's continued operation. 
ALSAC is the largest healthcare related charity in the United States. The National Executive Office is located in Memphis, Tennessee. ALSAC also has over 30 local fundraising offices located in cities throughout the United States that hold over 30,000 fundraising events annually.

Purpose and activities
As of 2021, St. Jude Children's Research Hospital costs nearly $1.7 billion per year to run, and donations provide an estimated 87% of those funds. Only 6% of the money to operate the hospital comes from insurance recoveries and 5% comes from grants.

To cover these costs, ALSAC has been raising more than $1 billion annually for the hospital through its more than 30,000 fund-raising activities. Notable fund-raising programs for the hospital include the FedEx St. Jude Classic, which is a PGA Tour event, Up 'til Dawn, and the St. Jude Memphis Marathon Weekend. Other fund-raising programs include direct mailings, radiothons, and television marketing.

One of the hospital’s most successful fund-raising efforts has been the Dream Home Giveaway. The giveaway allows contest entrants to reserve tickets for $100 each to qualify to win homes valued up to $775,000. The Dream Home Giveaway is conducted in cities within the United States.

In November 2004, St. Jude launched its inaugural Thanks and Giving campaign which encourages consumers to help raise funds at participating retailers by adding a donation at checkout or by purchasing specialty items to benefit St. Jude. The campaign has been is supported by network television spots, advertisements in major publications, featured content on The Today Show, and movie trailers.

St. Jude has been named one of two International Philanthropic Projects of Epsilon Sigma Alpha International, a women's service sorority. Since 1972, ESA has raised more than $200 million for St. Jude.

In September 2021, Inspiration4 became the first crewed orbital mission with no professional astronauts on board. The mission raised more than $240 million for St. Jude, which was its sole charitable beneficiary, and the crew included a stuffed puppy toy modeled after two service dogs at St. Jude.

From 2021 to 2022, a large plush duck toy, nicknamed “Mr. Vanderquack,” was used to fundraise for St. Jude . Groups of volunteers carried the duck through all fifty of the United States. In 2022, the convoy raised over $130,000 for St. Jude.

References

External links
ALSAC News & Events
St. Jude Children's Research Hospital
 ALSAC IRS Form 990 for FYE 06/30/2016 

Health charities in the United States
Organizations based in Memphis, Tennessee
St. Jude Children's Research Hospital
Organizations established in 1957
Non-profit organizations based in Tennessee
Medical and health organizations based in Tennessee